Erkin Mukhtarovich Ibragimov (born 24 May 1980 in Bishkek, Kirghiz SSR) is a Kyrgyz judoka, who competed in the men's half-middleweight category. He attained a fifth-place finish in the 81-kg division at the 2002 Asian Games in Busan, South Korea, and represented his nation Kyrgyzstan at the 2004 Summer Olympics.

Ibragimov qualified as a lone judoka for the Kyrgyz squad in the men's half-middleweight category at the 2004 Summer Olympics in Athens, by granting a tripartite invitation from the International Judo Federation. Although he managed a koka point in his opening match, Ibragimov could not deliver a powerful maneuver to flip U.S. judoka Rick Hawn, and thereby succumbed to a yuko at the end of the five-minute bout.

References

External links
 

1980 births
Living people
Kyrgyzstani male judoka
Olympic judoka of Kyrgyzstan
Judoka at the 2004 Summer Olympics
Judoka at the 2002 Asian Games
Sportspeople from Bishkek
Asian Games competitors for Kyrgyzstan
21st-century Kyrgyzstani people